Burnishing is a form of pottery treatment in which the surface of the pot is polished, using a hard smooth surface such as a wooden or bone spatula, smooth stones, plastic, or even glass bulbs, while it still is in a leathery 'green' state, i.e., before firing. After firing, the surface is extremely shiny. 

This technique can be applied to concrete masonry, creating a polished finish. 

Burnishing can also be applied to wood, by rubbing two pieces together along the grain. Hard woods take the treatment best. Burnishing does not protect the wood like a varnish does, but does impart a glossy sheen.

See also
Black-burnished ware, a type of Romano-British ceramic
Black-on-black ware, a pottery tradition developed by Puebloan Native American ceramic artists
Northern Black Polished Ware of Iron Age India

References

Artistic techniques
Types of pottery decoration